Talopeptin is a chemical compound derived from cultures of Streptomyces. It is a known reversible inhibitor of thermolysin and is expected to inhibit other metalloproteinases.   Chemically, talopeptin differs from its closely related peptidase inhibitor phosphoramidon by a single stereocenter.

References

External links
 The MEROPS online database for peptidases and their inhibitors: Talopeptin

Hydrolase inhibitors
Indoles
Phosphoramidates